Communauté d'agglomération du Grand Villeneuvois is the communauté d'agglomération, an intercommunal structure, centred on the town of Villeneuve-sur-Lot. It is located in the Lot-et-Garonne department, in the Nouvelle-Aquitaine region, southwestern France. Created in 2011, its seat is in Casseneuil. Its area is 354.9 km2. Its population was 47,571 in 2019, of which 21,742 in Villeneuve-sur-Lot proper.

Composition
The communauté d'agglomération consists of the following 19 communes:

Allez-et-Cazeneuve
Bias
Casseneuil
Cassignas
Castella
La Croix-Blanche
Dolmayrac
Fongrave
Hautefage-la-Tour
Laroque-Timbaut
Lédat
Monbalen
Pujols
Saint-Antoine-de-Ficalba
Sainte-Colombe-de-Villeneuve
Sainte-Livrade-sur-Lot
Saint-Étienne-de-Fougères
Saint-Robert
Villeneuve-sur-Lot

References

Villeneuve-sur-Lot
Villeneuve-sur-Lot